Sayed Khel is a district of Parwan province, Afghanistan.

See also
 Districts of Afghanistan

References

Districts of Parwan Province